Reindert "Rein" Berend Jan de Waal (24 November 1904, Amsterdam – 31 May 1985, Amsterdam) was a Dutch field hockey player who competed in the 1928 Summer Olympics and in the 1936 Summer Olympics.

In 1928 he was a member of the Dutch field hockey team, which won the silver medal. He played all four matches as back.

Eight years later he won the bronze medal with the Dutch team. He played all five matchers as back.

External links
 
profile

1904 births
1985 deaths
Dutch male field hockey players
Olympic field hockey players of the Netherlands
Field hockey players at the 1928 Summer Olympics
Field hockey players at the 1936 Summer Olympics
Olympic silver medalists for the Netherlands
Olympic bronze medalists for the Netherlands
Field hockey players from Amsterdam
Olympic medalists in field hockey
Medalists at the 1936 Summer Olympics
Medalists at the 1928 Summer Olympics
20th-century Dutch people